Louis Breunig (born 14 November 2003) is a German professional footballer who plays as a defender for  club 1. FC Nürnberg.

Career
After playing youth football with SV Theilheim, Würzburger FV, Greuther Fürth and Würzburger Kickers, Breunig signed a professional contract with Würzburg in April 2021. He made his debut on 29 August 2021, starting in a 1–1 draw with 1. FC Saarbrücken.

On 12 June 2022, Breunig joined 1. FC Nürnberg.

Personal life
He is the younger brother of SC Freiburg II player Maximilian Breunig.

References

External links

2003 births
Living people
German footballers
Association football midfielders
SpVgg Greuther Fürth players
Würzburger Kickers players
1. FC Nürnberg players
1. FC Nürnberg II players
3. Liga players
Regionalliga players